The 2013 Grand Prix Cycliste de Québec was the fourth edition of the Grand Prix Cycliste de Québec, a single-day professional bicycle road race. It was the 25th event of the 2013 UCI World Tour season. The race is one of the only two events which are part of the World Tour calendar in North America, the other one being the 2013 Grand Prix Cycliste de Montréal contested two days later.

Teams
As the Grand Prix Cycliste de Québec was a UCI World Tour event, all 19 UCI ProTeams were invited automatically and obligated to send a squad. A Canadian national squad also competed in the race, and as such, formed the event's 21-team peloton.

The 21 teams that competed in the race were:

Canada (national team) †

 †

Results

External links
 

2013
2013 UCI World Tour
Grand Prix Cycliste de Quebec
Grand Prix Cycliste de Québec